Cleveland Municipal Airport may refer to:

Cleveland Hopkins International Airport in Cleveland, Ohio, United States (FAA: CLE), known as Cleveland Municipal Airport until 1951
Cleveland Municipal Airport (Mississippi) in Cleveland, Mississippi, United States (FAA: RNV)
Cleveland Municipal Airport (Oklahoma) in Cleveland, Oklahoma, United States (FAA: 95F)
Cleveland Municipal Airport (Texas) in Cleveland, Texas, United States (FAA: 6R3)
Hardwick Field, also known as Cleveland Municipal Airport, in Cleveland, Tennessee, United States (FAA: HDI)